William P. Hogenson (October 26, 1884 – October 14, 1965) was an American athlete and sprinter, who competed in the early twentieth century. He won a silver medal in Athletics at the 1904 Summer Olympics in the men's 60 m dash, but was beaten by Archie Hahn, who took gold. He also won two bronze medals, over 100 m and 200 m, both distances won by Archie Hahn of the United States.

References

External links
profile

1884 births
1965 deaths
American male sprinters
Athletes (track and field) at the 1904 Summer Olympics
Olympic silver medalists for the United States in track and field
Olympic bronze medalists for the United States in track and field
Place of birth missing
Medalists at the 1904 Summer Olympics